Gregory S. Gordon is an American scholar of international law and a former genocide prosecutor during the Media Case at the International Criminal Tribunal for Rwanda. Gordon is known for his advocacy of the criminalization under international law of a broader category of speech likely to cause mass atrocities (more broad than incitement to genocide), and his book Atrocity Speech Law in which he advances this argument.  

Career
Gordon worked for the International Criminal Tribunal for Rwanda as prosecutor of the Media Case,  and the Office of Special Investigations. During his academic career, he was the director of University of North Dakota's Center for Human Rights and Genocide Studies and worked for the Sentinel Project for Genocide Prevention. He currently works for the Chinese University of Hong Kong Faculty of Law.

Views

Gordon supports establishing a new category of international law, which he terms "atrocity speech law", which would expand prosecutable offenses. The category would be more broad than incitement to genocide (currently criminalized), and would include ordering war crimes or crimes against humanity as an inchoate offense, which would be prosecutable even if the crimes ordered never took place. Gordon also supports the criminalization of incitement of war crimes and crimes against humanity. He supports the prosecution of people who are guilty of atrocity speech, and argues that international criminal law has a deterrent effect on those who are contemplating committing mass murder.  Gordon has said that  "if you don't prosecute the purveyors of these horrible messages, then you will definitely be looking at another genocide down the road". He supported the prosecution of Iranian president Mahmoud Ahmadinejad for incitement to genocide.

Atrocity Speech Law
Gordon's book Atrocity Speech Law: Foundation, Fragmentation, Fruition which is about extreme hate speech in international law, was published by Oxford University Press in 2017 and has received multiple positive reviews. In the book, he delineates the boundary between protected free speech and speech which is likely to cause mass violence, which he believes should be outlawed under international law. Gordon criticizes the current state of law on atrocity speech, which he considers fragmented and incoherent. For example, the International Criminal Tribunal for Rwanda and International Criminal Tribunal for the former Yugoslavia came to different conclusions about the prosecution of incitement, with the ICTR holding that speech that does not directly call for violence may be prosecutable, while the ICTY disagreed. Gordon proposes an expansion and systematization of the criminalization of atrocity speech. Benjamin B. Ferencz, chief prosecutor of the Einsatzgruppen Trial, wrote the foreword to the book.

Works

References

Living people
Year of birth missing (living people)
International Criminal Tribunal for Rwanda prosecutors
University of North Dakota faculty
Chinese University of Hong Kong people
Genocide studies scholars
International criminal law scholars